Prince Louis Napoléon Achille Charles Murat (25 August 1872 – 14 June 1943), also known as Napoléon Akhilovich Murat (in Russian: Наполеон Ахилович Мюрат), was a French-Georgian military officer. A member of the House of Murat and direct descendant of Caroline Bonaparte, sister of Napoleon, he was first commissioned in the French Army but spent most of his military career in the Imperial Russian Army, rising to the rank of major general.

Personal life
Murat was born on 25 August 1872 in Brunoy, France, the second child of Charles Louis Napoléon Achille Murat of the House of Murat, and Salome Dadiani, Georgian princess of Mingrelia and member of the House of Dadiani. He was a great-grandson of Joachim Murat, King of Naples and 1st Prince Murat, and grandnephew of Napoleon. He moved to his mother's native Georgia around 1904. Having returned to France in the early 1920s following Georgia's annexation by the Soviet Union and installation of a Bolshevik regime in the country, he worked as a translator. He died in Nice on 14 June 1943. He never married.

Military career
Murat began his military career in the French Army in 1891, and attended the École de cavalerie, Saumur. He served with the 25th Dragoon Regiment during the French conquest of Madagascar, where it was mistakenly reported that he had died from malaria. He became a lieutenant in 1899 when he was with the 14th Hussars Regiment, and later joined the 9th Cuirassier Regiment. Laws passed in France in the early 1900s meant that, as a member of a former ruling house, his opportunities for progression within the French Army became limited and he resigned his commission.

Murat left France and joined the Imperial Russian Army, where he was commissioned as lieutenant with the 2nd Dagestan Cavalry Regiment. He saw action in the Russo-Japanese War, during which time he was shot in the head and neck; he was decorated for his bravery. During this time he gained a reputation as a duelist.

In 1912, Murat resigned from the Russian Army to command a force of volunteers and mercenaries under the flag of Bulgaria during the First Balkan War. After spending time in the Americas, he rejoined the Imperial Russian Army at the outbreak of World War I, commanding the Ingush Regiment of the Caucasian Native Cavalry Division, also known as the Savage or Wild Division. Fighting in the Carpathians, he suffered severe frostbite to his legs, that ultimately resulted in double amputation some years later. He also commanded the 12th Dragoon Regiment Starodubovskogo and served in the Ministry of War. He rose to the rank of major general. During the Russian Civil War he fought with the White Armies.

Among his many honours, he was awarded the Cross of St. George and was appointed to the Order of St. Vladimir, 3rd class with swords, the Order of St. Anna, and the Order of St. Stanislaus. In 1928, he was appointed a chevalier of Legion d'Honneur.

Equestrian
Murat competed in four equestrian events at the 1900 Summer Olympics in Paris, winning the gold medal in the hacks and hunter combined event with his horse, The General. He also competed in the obstacle jumping, long jump and high jump events. He finished fourth in the long jump on Bayard, and was part of a jump off for third place in the high jump on Arcadius.

Ancestry

References

External links

1872 births
1943 deaths
Murat
French Army officers
Imperial Russian major generals
Chevaliers of the Légion d'honneur
Recipients of the Order of St. Vladimir, 3rd class
Recipients of the Order of St. Anna
Recipients of the Cross of St. George
French duellists
French people of Georgian descent
French male equestrians
Olympic equestrians of France
Equestrians at the 1900 Summer Olympics
Sportspeople from Essonne
Olympic gold medalists for France
Olympic medalists in equestrian
Medalists at the 1900 Summer Olympics
Russian military personnel of the Russo-Japanese War
Russian military personnel of World War I